The Tyndall Range, commonly called The Tyndalls, is a mountain range that is part of the West Coast Range located in the Western region of Tasmania, Australia.

The main focal point for the range is Mount Tyndall which lies at the northern part of the range.  The whole range western slopes can be viewed from the Anthony Road, while the plateau like formation of The Tyndalls is a road free area requiring viewing either from the air, or by foot.

Within the range lies the Tyndall Regional Reserve, a nature reserve that is the western buffer zone for the Cradle Mountain-Lake St Clair National Park World Heritage Area. The area is north of Mount Sedgwick.

The Tyndalls were named in 1877 by James Reid Scott on the suggestion of Thomas Bather Moore in honour of Professor John Tyndall, a Fellow of the Geological Society who made important contributions in physics, atmospheric science and geology.

Features
The Tyndall Range have a number of glacial lakes, the larger being Lake Huntley, Lake Rolleston, Lake Tyndall and Lake Matthew. The signs of the glaciation were first described by Thomas Bather Moore in 1894.

The Tyndalls were explored for minerals in the early twentieth century, but no significant working mine ever eventuated.

The Tyndalls lie south east of the Henty Gold Mine, and Hydro Tasmania dam on the upper Henty River and south of Lake Mackintosh, Lake Murchison and Tullah.  They are west of the Sticht Range.

See also

List of highest mountains of Tasmania

References

Further reading

External links 
 West Coast Range on Google Maps
 https://web.archive.org/web/20070907132410/http://www.parks.tas.gov.au/wha/wherein/detail.html – context of World Heritage Area

Tyndall
West Coast Range